Robert Schnabel (born November 10, 1978) is a Czech former professional ice hockey defenceman. He played 22 games in the National Hockey League with the Nashville Predators between 2002 and 2004. The rest of his career, which lasted from 1996 to 2014, was mainly spent in various European leagues.

Playing career
Schnabel was drafted by the New York Islanders in round 3, #79 overall, of the 1997 NHL Entry Draft and again by the Phoenix Coyotes in round 5, #129 overall, in the 1998 NHL Entry Draft. 

He was a product of HC Slavia Praha in the Czech league. After several seasons in North America, including 22 National Hockey League games for the Nashville Predators, Schnabel returned to Europe to represent first his hometown team in Prague and then HIFK in the Finnish SM-liiga. In January 2007 Schnabel's contract with HIFK was terminated upon arrival of Billy Tibbetts, as the SM-liiga only allowed a team to dress four foreign-born players per game, and Tibbets was HIFK's fifth foreign player. Schnabel was subsequently signed by Jokerit of the same league. He played for BK Mladá Boleslav on loan from HC Kladno.

During his two seasons at the Manchester Phoenix, Schnabel won an EPIHL League Championship winners medal as well as both winners and runners-up medals in the Playoffs. In 2013–14 he was named to the EPIHL's First All Star Team by Ice Hockey Journalists.

His retirement from hockey was announced via the Manchester Phoenix on 7 April 2014, the day after Phoenix lost 5–3 in the EPIHL Playoff Final to Basingstoke Bison at the Skydome Arena in Coventry.

Career statistics

Regular season and playoffs

International

External links
 

1978 births
Living people
Arizona Coyotes draft picks
BK Mladá Boleslav players
Czech ice hockey defencemen
HC Benátky nad Jizerou players
HC Plzeň players
HC Slavia Praha players
HC Slovan Bratislava players
HC Sparta Praha players
HIFK (ice hockey) players
HK 36 Skalica players
Jokerit players
Rytíři Kladno players
Manchester Phoenix players
Milwaukee Admirals players
Nashville Predators players
New York Islanders draft picks
Piráti Chomutov players
Red Deer Rebels players
SHC Fassa players
Ice hockey people from Prague
Springfield Falcons players
Timrå IK players
Czech expatriate ice hockey players in Canada
Czech expatriate ice hockey players in the United States
Czech expatriate ice hockey players in Sweden
Czech expatriate ice hockey players in Finland
Czech expatriate ice hockey players in Slovakia
Czech expatriate sportspeople in Italy
Czech expatriate sportspeople in England
Expatriate ice hockey players in England
Expatriate ice hockey players in Italy